The 1998 Barking and Dagenham London Borough Council election took place on 7 May 1998 to elect members of Barking and Dagenham London Borough Council in London, England. The whole council was up for election and the Labour Party stayed in overall control of the council.

Background
The election saw the Conservative Party only put up five candidates in the election, and they failed to win any seats on the council. The Labour leader of the council, George Brooker, stood down at the election after 51 years. He opposed the Greater London Authority referendum that took place at the same time as the election, however Barking and Dagenham saw 73.49% vote in favour and 26.51% against. Overall turnout in the election was 25.41%.

Election result

|}

Ward results

Abbey

Alibon

Becontree

Cambell

Chadwell Heath

Eastbrook

Eastbury

Fanshawe

Gascoigne

Goresbrook

Heath

Longbridge

Manor

Marks Gate

Parsloes

River

Thames

Triptons

Valence

Village

By-elections between 1998 and 2002

Goresbrook

The by-election was called following the resignation of Cllr. Terence P. Power.

Eastbury

The by-election was called following the resignation of Cllr. Stephen W. Churchman.

Marks Gate

The by-election was called following the death of Cllr. Colin T. W. Pond.

References

1998
1998 London Borough council elections